Oscar Nakaoshi  (born March 28, 1991) is a Brazilian professional baseball pitcher. He attended Hakuoh University and represented Brazil at  2013 World Baseball Classic.

References

External links
Baseball America

1991 births
Living people
Brazilian expatriate baseball players in Japan
Brazilian people of Japanese descent
Hiroshima Toyo Carp players
Nippon Professional Baseball pitchers
2013 World Baseball Classic players
Brazilian expatriate sportspeople in New Zealand
Expatriate baseball players in New Zealand
Auckland Tuatara players